is a Japanese actress, voice actress and singer. A prolific voice performer in anime, she has amassed several film and television credits since her debut in 2003. She won the Seiyu Award for Best Supporting Actress in 2015, and won the Newtype Anime Awards for Best Voice Actress three times in 2015, 2017 and 2018. 

Hanazawa's voice roles include Nadeko Sengoku in Monogatari, Anri Sonohara in Durarara!!, Angel / Kanade Tachibana in Angel Beats!, Kuroneko / Ruri Gokō in Oreimo, Mayuri Shiina in Steins;Gate, Akane Tsunemori in Psycho-Pass, Kosaki Onodera in Nisekoi, Chiaki Nanami in Danganronpa, Marry Kozakura in Kagerou Project, Kobato Hanato in Kobato, Rize Kamishiro in Tokyo Ghoul, Hinata Kawamoto in March Comes in Like a Lion, Ichika Nakano in The Quintessential Quintuplets, Mitsuri Kanroji in Demon Slayer: Kimetsu no Yaiba, and Atsuko Hakari in Blue Archive. 

Hanazawa's debut single, was released on April 25, 2012, under the Aniplex/Sony Music Entertainment Japan label.

Career

Hanazawa began acting when she was in kindergarten. She made regular appearances at the variety program Yappari Sanma Daisensei.

She made her voice acting debut as Holly in Last Exile. She played Ryoko Kaminagi in Zegapain. She was signed up with voice acting agency Office Osawa.

Hanazawa went to university in 2007, while at the same time, she began to make her mark as a voice actress. She voiced the title character in Kobato., Suou in Darker than Black: Gemini of the Meteor, Nadeko Sengoku in Bakemonogatari, Angel / Kanade Tachibana in Angel Beats, and Anri Sonohara in Durarara!!. She was voted in 2010 as "Best Female Voice Actress" by listeners of the radio program . She graduated from university in 2011, and in the same year became a full-time voice actress. In late 2010, she was invited to the Anime Festival Asia anime convention in Singapore.

On February 23, 2012, it was announced that Hanazawa would launch her official website. A few days later, during the "Kana Hanazawa Solo Debut Presentation Party event", it was announced that she would release four singles within a year:  released on April 25, released on July 18, "Happy Endings", released on October 24 and was used as ending theme for anime Zetsuen no Tempest, and "Silent Snow", released on January 16, 2013. Her first album Claire was released on February 20, 2013, and her second album 25 was released on February 26, 2014. She released an album title Blue Avenue in April 2015, and went on a concert tour starting at the Nippon Budokan on May 3. The Blu-ray release of the show, Live Avenue Kana Hanazawa in Budokan, ranked number six in sales.

Hanazawa won Best Supporting Actress at the 9th Seiyu Awards. She later won Newtypes Best Voice Actress award. Hanazawa starred in her first live-action feature film . Her video would later place tenth in Oricon's Blu-ray Disc Chart. Hanazawa moved to the Sacra Music record label under Sony Music Entertainment Japan in April 2017.

As of 2021, she is currently signed to Pony Canyon.

Personal life

In February 2017, during a live stream promoting the release of Opportunity, Hanazawa confirmed she and Kensho Ono were dating, after Shūkan Bunshun published allegations about their relationship. On July 8, 2020, they announced that they married.

Filmography

Animation

Animated films

Video games

Drama CDs

Live action

Dubbing
Live-action

Animation

Other works

Discography

Albums

Singles

Digital Singles

Tours
Kana Hanazawa concert tour 2019 (2019, in Japan and China)

Awards

References

External links
   (SME)
   (PonyCanyon)
 
 
 
 Kana Hanazawa at Oricon 
 

1989 births
Living people
Anime singers
Japanese child actresses
Japanese women pop singers
Japanese YouTubers
Japanese video game actresses
Japanese voice actresses
Music YouTubers
Sacra Music artists
Seiyu Award winners
Singers from Tokyo
Voice actresses from Tokyo
21st-century Japanese actresses
21st-century Japanese singers
21st-century Japanese women singers